Benešov (also known as Benešov u Prahy) is a town in the Central Bohemian Region of the Czech Republic. It has about 16,000 inhabitants. The town is known for the Konopiště Castle.

Administrative parts
Villages of Baba, Bedrč, Boušice, Buková Lhota, Červený Dvůr, Chvojen, Dlouhé Pole, Konopiště, Mariánovice, Okrouhlice, Pomněnice, Radíkovice, Úročnice and Vidlákova Lhota are administrative parts of Benešov.

Geography
The town is located in the Benešov Uplands on the Benešovský Stream. In the western part of the territory are situated the ponds Konopišťský and Jarkovický.

History

The area of Benešov began to be settled in the 11th century. The first settlers are believed to have arrived on Karlov Hill in around 1050 during the Přemyslid dynasty. The first written verified mention of Benešov is from 1219–1222, however there are unverified mentions from 1048 and 1070.

Benešov was seat of Lords of Benešov until 1317, when they moved to nearby Konopiště Castle. In 1327, Benešov became a market town. In 1420, the town was conquered and burned by the Hussites. Benešov however recovered and at the end of the 15th century, it belonged among the most important towns in Bohemia. It was the centre of several political negotiations, such as the 1451 and 1473 meetings of the Bohemian Diet. In the 15th and 16th centuries the town experienced an economic boom, especially thanks to its location on the trade route from Prague to Linz. In 1512, Benešov became a town.

A contemporary first edition map in Latin by A. Ortelius dated 1570 spells the town as Benissaw. After the end of the 16th Century there were several changes in ownership. During the Thirty Years' War, the population had suffered because of passing Polish and Swedish troops. To promote the reintroduction of Catholicism and improving the education, a Priory college with a high school was founded in 1703. After 1803 the town developed as a centre of national rebirth for Slavic Bohemians.

In 1871 the town was connected to Prague by rail and by 1895 it was an important regional hub.

By World War I Benešov was an important garrison town of the Austro-Hungarian Monarchy. There were the II. Bataillon des Böhmischen Infanterie-Regiments Nr. 102 (Second Battalion of the Bohemian Infantry Regiment No. 102) and the II. Bataillon des k.k. Landwehr-Infanterie-Regiments Nr. 28 (Second Battalion of the Imperial Landwehr Infantry Regiment No. 28). Because of fears of possible political unrest in 1916 by Czech nationalists, the 2nd Regiment of the Tiroler Kaiserjäger with a reserve unit part from Bolzano was stationed here to 1918.

Early during World War II the town was evacuated temporarily as the SS-Truppenübungsplatz Böhmen of the Waffen SS was stationed here.

A significant measure of industrialization began after 1945 with the establishment of a machinery factory and the food industry.

Demographics

Transport
The town is served by one railway station. It lies on the Prague–České Budějovice railroad.

Sights

The most significant monument is the Konopiště Castle. As of 2019, it was the 7th most visited castle in the country with 147,000 visitors. It was built in 1294 as a copy of French fortresses. Around 1500, it was modificated to the late Gothic style, and in 1605 to the Renaissance style. After 1725, it was rebuilt in the Baroque style.

The Church of Saint Nicholas is the oldest preserved monument in Benešov. It was built in early Gothic style in the second half of the 13th century. After a fire in 1420, it was rebuilt in the Renaissance style in 1583, and later once again in the Baroque style. The church includes a Gothic bell from 1322, one of the oldest preserved bells in the Czech Republic.

Another important religious monument are the former Priory college with the Church of Saint Anne, which was built at the beginning of the 18th century according to plans submitted by the Italian architect Giovanni Battista Alliprandi.

The town centre with Masarykovo Square include Baroque and Art Nouveau houses and the architecturally awarded building of the new town hall.

Notable people
Josef Suk (1874–1935), composer and violinist; lived and died here
Karel Nový (1890–1980), writer
Princess Sophie of Hohenberg (1901–1990), Austrian princess
Prince Ernst of Hohenberg (1904–1954), Austrian prince
Miroslav Beránek (born 1957), football player and manager
Michal Hocek (born 1969), chemist
Monika Absolonová (born 1976), singer and actress
Jitka Bartoničková (born 1985), athlete
Aneta Langerová (born 1986), pop singer

Twin towns – sister cities

Benešov is twinned with:
 Partizánske, Slovakia
 Sainte-Agnès, France

References

External links

 
Cities and towns in the Czech Republic
Populated places in Benešov District